Guilhèm Adèr (in French language Guilhem Ader  ; Gimont ?, 1567 ? - Gimont, 1638) was an Occitan language writer from Gascony. He is the author of a book a maxims inspired from Cato (Lo Catonet Gascon) and of an epic poem dedicated to Henry III of Navarre and IV France in 2690 alexandrines.

He was born in Gimont, Gascony. He studied in Toulouse and became a physician and served in the Duc of Joyeuse's army. Afterward he settle back in Gimont where he married Magdalena de Lux and had a daughter and son.

Bibliography

Ader's edition 
 Jeanroy, Alfred Poésies de Guillaume Ader, publiées avec notice, traduction et Notes. Tolosa : Privat, 1904
 Adèr Guilhèm. Lo Catonet gascon. Ortès : Per Noste, 2008.
 Adèr Guilhèm. Lo gentilòme gascon. Ortès : Per Noste, 2010.

Critics 
 Garavini, Fausta. La letteratura occitanica moderna. Bologna : Sansoni, 1970
 Gardy, Felip. Guilhem Ader (1567?-1638) : actes du colloque de Lombez (21-22 septembre 1991). Beziers : Centre International de Documentacion Occitana, 1992.
 Gardy, Felip, Histoire et anthologie de la littérature occitane, Tome II, l'âge du baroque - 1520 -1789. Montpellier : Presses du Languedoc, 1997.

External links 
 
  
 1628 edition of Lo Catonet gascon on gallica.bnf.fr, National French Library.
 Lo Catonet gascon on Google Books.
 Lo gentilòme gascon, 1610 on gallica.bnf.fr, National French Library

1560s births
1638 deaths
Occitan-language writers